Igor Prahić (born 15 April 1987) is a Croatian professional footballer who plays as a centre back for SpG Edelserpentin.

Career
In December 2008, Prahić was invited on a trial at Celtic, with media speculations saying he might sign for the Scottish side during the 2008–09 winter transfer window.

Prahić rose through all youth levels playing for Varteks before debuting in top-flight football in 2006. He also has 40 caps for Croatia's youth teams. On 16 December 2010 CS Sedan signed Croatian centre-back from Varaždin (Varteks' new name, as of June 2010) until June 2012.

On 2 September 2013, Prahić agreed a deal to play for the Romanian team Vaslui for three years, being signed as a replacement for Fernando Varela, who is expected to sign with Steaua.

Iran
On 29 July 2014, Prahić signed with newly promoted Persian Gulf Pro League side Padideh. Prahic left Padideh in January 2016 and announced he was retiring from football. However, Prahic signed with Naft Tehran on 17 July 2016.

References

External links
 
Profile at Sportnet.hr 
Profile at oefb.at 

1987 births
Living people
Sportspeople from Varaždin
Association football central defenders
Croatian footballers
Croatia youth international footballers
Croatia under-21 international footballers
NK Varaždin players
CS Sedan Ardennes players
NK Istra 1961 players
NK Zadar players
FC Vaslui players
Shahr Khodro F.C. players
NK Zavrč players
Naft Tehran F.C. players
NK Nafta Lendava players
NK Drava Ptuj players
NK Zagorec Krapina players
Croatian Football League players
First Football League (Croatia) players
Ligue 2 players
Liga I players
Persian Gulf Pro League players
Slovenian Second League players
Austrian 2. Landesliga players
Croatian expatriate footballers
Expatriate footballers in France
Croatian expatriate sportspeople in France
Expatriate footballers in Romania
Croatian expatriate sportspeople in Romania
Expatriate footballers in Iran
Croatian expatriate sportspeople in Iran
Expatriate footballers in Slovenia
Croatian expatriate sportspeople in Slovenia
Expatriate footballers in Austria
Croatian expatriate sportspeople in Austria